"Psycho Man" is a single by heavy metal band Black Sabbath. It was originally released on the Reunion album in 1998, and was the first of two new singles from the album, the other being "Selling My Soul." The song reached number 3 on the U.S. Mainstream Rock chart. The song was later included in Ozzy Osbourne's 2005 box set Prince of Darkness. The music and lyrics were written by singer Ozzy Osbourne and guitarist Tony Iommi. "Psycho Man" and "Selling My Soul" are the only Black Sabbath songs to be credited just to these two members. In Canada, the song reached number 24 on the RPM charts.

In 1999, "Psycho Man" was remixed by Danny Saber for No Boundaries: A Benefit for the Kosovar Refugees; music critic Robert Christgau regarded it as a highlight of the album.

As a drum machine would be used for "Selling My Soul", "Psycho Man" would prove to be the last original Black Sabbath song to feature Bill Ward on drums.

Track listing
"Psycho Man" (Danny Saber Remix) – 4:17
"Psycho Man" (radio edit) – 4:06
"Psycho Man" (album version) – 5:23

Personnel
Ozzy Osbourne – vocals
Tony Iommi – guitar
Geezer Butler – bass guitar
Bill Ward – drums
Bob Marlette – producing, engineering

References

Black Sabbath songs
1998 singles
Song recordings produced by Bob Marlette
Songs written by Ozzy Osbourne
Songs written by Tony Iommi
1998 songs